Étienne de la Vaissière (born 5 November 1969 in Dijon) is a French historian, professor at the École des hautes études en sciences sociales, in Paris. He is teaching economic and social history of early medieval Central Asia, before and after the arrival of Islam. He is a specialist of the Sogdian culture, its traders and nobility, and also of the nomadic invasions of the 4th-5th centuries.
Some of his theories are:
a depiction of the network which gave to the image of "Silk Road"  its only historical reality during the Early Middle Ages
the textual proof that the Huns and the Xiongnu are indeed synonymous 
a shift of two centuries in the history of Eastern Manichaeism (it arrived in China in the 6th century)
a reinterpretation of Abbasid 9th century political history pushing the birth of the mamluk phenomenon to the 860s-870s

Books 
 , De Boccard, Paris, 2002
 New edition corrected and expanded, 2004 
 English translation 
 , Peeters, Louvain, 2007 
 With Éric Trombert, École française d’Extrême-Orient, Paris, 2005 
 With M. Ghose "Ephtalites", in Bulletin of the Asia Institute, 2007.
 Islamisation de l'Asie centrale. Processus locaux d'acculturation du VIIe au XIe siècle, Peeters, Louvain, 2008.

Articles

References

External links
Archeao.ens.fr

Writers from Dijon
Living people
1969 births
20th-century French historians
21st-century French historians
Historians of Central Asia
Academic staff of the École pratique des hautes études
Sogdian language